Dennis John Trewin  (born 14 August 1946) is an Australian former public servant, who was the Australian Statistician, the head of the Australian Bureau of Statistics, between July 2000 and January 2007.

Trewin joined the ABS in 1966 as a statistics cadet.  Between 1992 and 1995 he was the Deputy Government Statistician in Statistics New Zealand and a Deputy Australian Statistician from 1995 to 2000, when he was appointed as the Australian Statistician.

Trewin was the driving force behind the ABS's pioneering 'Measures of Australia's Progress' (MAP), a new system of integrated national progress measurement, linking economic, social, environmental and governance dimensions of progress, a project which gained wide respect among other national statistical offices and helped bring about the OECD's global project, 'Measuring the Progress of Societies'.

He holds other senior appointments in Australia such as non-judicial member of the Australian Electoral Commission and an adjunct professor at Swinburne University.  He has held the office of president of the Statistical Society of Australia.

Internationally, in 2005 he completed a term as president of the International Statistical Institute having previously been vice-president and president of the International Association of Survey Statisticians.  He is a past editor of the International Statistical Review. He is chairman of the global executive board at the World Bank, chairman of the Asia/Pacific Committee of Statistics, and chairman of the advisory board of Swinburne University of Technology's Swinburne Institute for Social Research.

Trewin holds honorary life memberships of the International Statistical Institute and the Statistical Society of Australia. He was listed as one of Australia's Smart 100 in a 2003 poll run by the Australian magazine The Bulletin.

Notes

References and further reading

1946 births
Living people
Presidents of the International Statistical Institute
Elected Members of the International Statistical Institute
Australian public servants
Australian statisticians
Officers of the Order of Australia
Recipients of the Centenary Medal